Elk Valley is a valley in Christian County in the Ozarks of southwest Missouri.

The source area for the valley stream lies about one mile northwest of the community of Christian Center and on the south edge of the Springfield Plateau. The stream flows northwest crossing under U.S. Route 65 midway between Selmore and Ozark. The stream continues and passes under and parallels Missouri Route F reaching its confluence with Finley Creek about one mile northeast of Riverdale.

Elk Valley was named for the fact the valley was a hunting ground of elk by pioneers. The Elk were hunted out in the 1880's.

Lead and Zinc mines were produced ore up until the 1920's. One mine in Ozark was reported to have produces as much as 180 tons of lead ore in or around 1904. The mines are still in the valley some have shafts that are 100 feet or more. There are at least 7 seven mines in the Elk Valley area.

References

Valleys of Christian County, Missouri
Valleys of Missouri